SMS Aspern was the second of the three s built for the Austro-Hungarian Navy in the 1890s. The Zentas were intended to serve as fleet scouts and to guard the battleships against attacks by torpedo boats. They carried a main battery of eight  guns manufactured by Škoda; Aspern and her sisters were the first major warships of the Austro-Hungarian fleet to be armed entirely with domestically produced guns. Unlike earlier Austro-Hungarian cruisers, the Zenta class discarded heavy belt armor in favor of a higher top speed.

Aspern spent much of her early career abroad, being sent to join the campaign against the Boxer Rebellion in Qing China in 1900, though by the time she arrived, most of the fighting was over. She remained there until early 1902 when she briefly returned to Austria-Hungary, though she was sent back to Chinese waters later that year. After returning home again in 1904, she served with elements of the main fleet. The ship was sent to represent Austria-Hungary at the Jamestown Exposition in the United States in 1907 and participated in operations in the eastern Mediterranean to protect Europeans living in the Ottoman Empire later in the decade. In 1913, captained by frigate captain Paul Stupar, she was involved in the blockade of Montenegro imposed by the Great Powers during the First Balkan War. She was decommissioned in late 1913.

At the start of World War I in July 1914, the ship was mobilized and assigned to I Cruiser Division. She sortied a number of times to support other cruisers and destroyers that were engaged with enemy vessels, though Aspern never directly engaged them. She bombarded Allied positions on Lovćen in January 1916 to support a successful assault on the mountain. The ship was decommissioned again in 1918, disarmed, and converted into a barracks ship. After the war, she was ceded to the United Kingdom as a war prize and was broken up in Italy in 1920.

Design

The latter were intended to screen the battleships of the main fleet, scouting for enemy vessels and protecting them from torpedo boat attacks. Final approval came after work on the first unit, had already begun.

The crew of the Zentas numbered 308 officers and enlisted men. Their propulsion system consisted of a pair of triple-expansion steam engines, each driving a screw propeller using steam provided by eight coal-fired Yarrow boilers.

The Zentas' main battery consisted of eight 40-caliber  quick-firing guns manufactured by Škoda. One gun was mounted on the upper deck forward, six in casemates in the hull, and the remaining gun was placed on the upper deck aft. They also carried eight 44-caliber  Škoda guns and two 33-caliber 47 mm Hotchkiss guns for defense against torpedo boats. These guns were all mounted individually, with four in the superstructure and the rest in casemates in the hull. The ships also carried a pair of  Salvator-Dormus M1893 machine guns. Their armament was rounded out with a pair of  torpedo tubes that were carried in the hull above the waterline. The three Zenta-class cruisers were the first major Austro-Hungarian warships to carry an armament entirely manufactured by Škoda.

The ships' armor deck consisted of two layers of  steel over the bow and stern. Amidships, where it protected the propulsion machinery spaces, it doubled in thickness to a pair of  layers. Each of the 120 mm guns was protected by a  gun shield, although they were not large enough to provide good cover for the gun crews.

Service history

The keel for Aspern was laid down at the Pola Arsenal on 4 October 1897 under the contract name "Kreuzer B", also designated Ersatz (replacement)  for the elderly sloop-of-war. Her completed hull was launched on 3 May 1899 and fitting out was completed by 29 May 1900, when she was commissioned into the fleet at a cost of 4.5 million krone. She was named for the Battle of Aspern-Essling of 1809. After entering service, Aspern joined the Summer Squadron for its annual training maneuvers, which lasted until 21 July. During this period, she served as the flagship of III Division, leading a flotilla of torpedo boats. She was present for a visit by a British squadron to Trieste in July. The ships of III Division were present for the launching of the pre-dreadnought  in Trieste.

Deployments to China, 1900–1904
By this time, the Boxer Rebellion had broken out in Qing China, prompting Austria-Hungary to send Aspern along with the protected cruiser  to strengthen the forces of the Eight-Nation Alliance that had assembled to defeat the rebellion. The two ships left Pola on 24 July, transiting the Suez Canal before stopping in Aden, Ottoman Yemen, on 4 August. From there, they crossed to Colombo, British Ceylon, and then proceeded to Singapore, arriving there on 20 August. Aspern then steamed north to British Hong Kong, where she spent several days re-coaling, before arriving at Taku in September, while Kaiserin Elisabeth went to Wusong. At Taku, Aspern joined the armored cruiser  and Asperns sister ship Zenta. Aspern stayed there from 7 September until 20 November, though by that time, the fighting had largely subsided. The ship thereafter left to visit Japanese ports where she stayed until late December before returning to China.

While Aspern was making her way into Shanghai's harbor on 8 February 1901, the British steam ship  crossed in front of her bow, causing a collision. Luckily for the British vessel, she was not struck by Asperns ram bow; the latter's bow was badly damaged and her ram was detached. The cruiser was compelled to enter the dry dock in Pudong for repairs to her bow. Divers recovered her ram and repair work lasted from 3 March to 16 April. She entered the Yangtze River on 28 May for a cruise upriver before returning to open waters in early June, spending the next four months patrolling the ports of northern China. In late October, Aspern visited Nagasaki, Japan, for a dry-docking from 21 October to 21 November and remained in Japan for the rest of the year.

At the beginning of 1902 the ship was recalled home and arrived in Hong Kong on 6 January, after which Aspern sailed south to Singapore. Aspern sailed to Penang in the Dutch East Indies and then steamed north to Calcutta, British India, where she arrived on the 27th. She continued on to Colombo, before passing through the Suez Canal at the beginning of March. The cruiser reached home waters on 13 March, stopping first at Lesina before moving to Trieste two days later, and arriving finally in Pola on the 19th. The rest of the year passed uneventfully. From 15 June 1903 to 4 September, Aspern operated with the Summer Squadron as part of II Division. She lay at Fiume from 19 to 24 July before rejoining the squadron in Trieste from 14 to 22 August. The ship was then ordered to return to Chinese waters for another tour abroad.

Aspern departed Pola on 20 September and relieved the armored cruiser  as the station ship in East Asian waters on 2 October. She arrived in Hong Kong on 29 October and spent the next several months visiting various ports in China. On 6 March 1904, she was subordinated to the recently arrived Kaiserin Elisabeth. Her tour of China continued through the year, including another voyage up the Yangtze in June and July. In October, she was once again recalled home, departing Hong Kong on the 15th and passing through the Suez Canal a month later. Aspern reached Pola on 22 November, where she had a wireless set installed.

Service in home waters, 1904–1914
The ship served in the Levant Squadron from 1 January 1905 to 31 May, patrolling the Eastern Mediterranean Sea. She left Pola on 1 February for a tour of ports in the region, including Piraeus, Greece, from 5 to 16 February, Salonika, Ottoman Empire, from 20 March to 7 April, among numerous others. She arrived back in Pola on 19 May, but immediately departed for Trieste where she was present for the launching of the pre-dreadnought  on the 21st. Aspern then went into drydock for modifications, including the relocation of her bow torpedo tube further aft and the installation of a pair of Vickers  cannon. Aspern operated with the battleships of I. Heavy Division for exercises from 15 to 20 June 1906. Later that year, she took part in large-scale fleet and amphibious assault maneuvers held at Gravosa from 12 to 15 September, which were observed by Archduke Franz Ferdinand. The exercises concluded with a naval review off Calamotta on 15 September, after which Aspern returned to Pola, where she was placed in reserve five days later.

On 17 March 1907, Aspern was recommissioned for a cruise abroad in company with the armored cruiser  to the United States to take part in the Jamestown Exposition, marking the 300th anniversary of the Jamestown colony, the first permanent English settlement in the Americas. The two cruisers departed Pola on 26 March and stopped in Cagliari, Sardinia, where men who had contracted scarlet fever were disembarked. The vessels then proceeded to Gibraltar, Funchal on the island of Madeira, and Grassy Bay, Bermuda, before arriving in Hampton Roads, Virginia, on 25 April. They remained there through 14 May before steaming north to New York thereafter returning to Hampton Roads. They took part in a fleet review after returning and got underway to return home on 15 June. They stopped in the Azores, Portugal, in late June and then in Algiers, French Algeria, reaching Pola on 10 July. Aspern was assigned to III Division as the flotilla leader from 16 July to 15 September.

Aspern spent the year 1908 in reserve and was reactivated on 27 March 1909 to replace the torpedo cruiser  as the station ship in Trieste. On 9 May, part of her crew were sent to participate in a celebration marking the 100th anniversary of the Battle of Aspern. The rest of the year passed uneventfully, and her time as a station ship temporarily came to an end on 28 February 1910, when she was ordered to serve as the flotilla leader for the Torpedo-boat Flotilla, replacing Kaiser Karl VI, which had been sent on a cruise abroad. During this period, Aspern was present for the launch of the pre-dreadnought  on 12 April in Trieste. She resumed her station ship duties on 6 May until 15 November, when she was decommissioned for a major overhaul of the ship's propulsion machinery and partial replacement of her boiler tubes. She also had an oven to bake fresh bread installed. Work lasted into 1911, and she remained out of service for the entire year.

In early 1912, Aspern was assigned to the Reserve Squadron. She was present at the launching ceremony for the dreadnought battleship  on 20 March. Six days later, she participated in a naval review held in Fasana for the visit of German Kaiser Wilhelm II. Aspern was detached to join I Cruiser Division, which was sent to the Ottoman Empire, from 15 May to 15 August to protect Austro-Hungarian interests during a period of unrest in the country. The fleet left Pola on 5 November and stopped in Beşik Bay at the entrance to the Dardanelles on 7 November, where they waited for two days for authorization to enter the straits and proceed to the Ottoman capital at Constantinople. There, they stayed until 2 December; further riots did not develop, so the fleet was recalled, arriving in Pola on 6 December.

Aspern returned to the shipyard in 1913 to have new wireless equipment installed. During the First Balkan War, an international fleet was composed to blockade Montenegro over its occupation of the port of Scutari. Aspern was sent as part of the Austro-Hungarian contingent, departing Pola on 20 March and arrived off Herceg Novi, Montenegro, the next day. She rotated on and off blockade duty until the end of the war on 30 May. When the Second Balkan War began a month later, she resumed blockade duty until early December when she returned to Pola and was decommissioned on 13 December.

World War I

Aspern was mobilized at the start of World War I in July 1914, being recommissioned on 31 July and briefly conducting sea trials starting on 21 August before being assigned to I Cruiser Division, which at that time included Sankt Georg, Kaiser Karl VI, Kaiserin und Königin Maria Theresia, and the other two Zenta-class cruisers, under the command of Vice Admiral Paul Fiedler. She got underway on 19 September with a group of torpedo boats for a patrol in the waters off Porozina. On 29 December, the cruiser  and several destroyers raided Allied shipping to Durazzo, and encountered Allied warships in the First Battle of Durazzo, Aspern sortied with Kaiser Karl VI, Novara, the coastal defense ship , and several destroyers to cover their withdrawal, though they did not see action.

The ship was present for the attack on Lovćen in early January 1916, providing gunfire support to soldiers fighting their way up the mountain on 8 and 9 January. She also shelled targets at Kovači, Popovic, and Zagora, Montenegro. The attack succeeded and cleared the mountain of Allied observation posts that reported on Austro-Hungarian ship movements. This allowed the Austro-Hungarians to shift I. Cruiser Division further south to Cattaro, where it could more easily raid Allied shipping in the southern Adriatic Sea. At 06:00 on 2 August, Aspern, escorted by a pair of 250t-class torpedo boats, sortied to come to the aid of Warasdiner and Wildfang, which had fought a 45-minute battle with the British cruiser , the Italian cruiser , and several French and Italian destroyers and torpedo boats. The appearance of Aspern and the torpedo boats prompted the Allied ships to disengage, allowing the Austro-Hungarians to return to port.

At some point in 1917, the ship received a  L/45 anti-aircraft gun. She participated in shooting practice in Topla Bay near Herceg Novi on 24 July 1917. She departed Cattaro on 28 October and arrived in Pola two days later. On 12 November, she moved to Trieste, where she was visited by Kaiser Karl I on 19 November. On 13 March 1918, Aspern returned to Pola with her sister ship . The next day, both ships were removed from active service to free their crews for use on merchant ships in the Black Sea. Aspern was reduced to a barracks ship for the mine warfare command, supported by the tender Gamma. On 15 March, Aspern was decommissioned and disarmed and she spent the rest of the war in Pola. She was ceded to the United Kingdom as a war prize after the conflict and was sold to ship breakers in Italy in 1920.

Notes

References

Further reading
 

Zenta-class cruisers
World War I cruisers of Austria-Hungary
1899 ships